Ust-Karsk, formerly known as Ust-Kara is an urban-type settlement in the Sretensky District of  Zabaykalsky Krai, Russia. The settlement is located on the northern bank of the Shilka River, near the mouth of its left tributary, the Kara River. Population: 

The name of the town means "Kara mouth".

Climate

Ust-Karsk has a pure continental climate and it is the hottest place in Siberia. On July 12, 2010, Ust-Karsk set the high temperature record for Asian Russia,. This took place during a massive heatwave felt throughout Russia and China.

History
The history of Ust-Kara is closely connected to that of the Kara katorga, a network of prison settlements that existed in the area in 1838–1893. Prisoners were used to work gold mines. In the early 1850s, the annual gold production on the Kara was around 70 pood (1100 kg).

In the 1850s, during the preparations for the Amur Annexation, Ust-Kara was one of the sites (along with the Shilkinsky Zavod and Bolshaya Kularka) where barges were built for the Russian military expeditions down the Amur.

See also
Nerchinsk katorga
Nadezhda Sigida

Sources

Urban-type settlements in Zabaykalsky Krai